This is a list of notable mascots and characters created specifically for advertising purposes, listed alphabetically by the product they represent.

The list

References

See also
 List of American advertising characters
 List of Australian and New Zealand advertising characters
 List of Japanese advertising characters

European and British
Advertising characters, European and British
Advertising characters